Kapelebyong District  is a district in Eastern Uganda.

References

Districts of Uganda
Teso sub-region
Eastern Region, Uganda